Chris Zinzan Harris (born 20 November 1969) is a former New Zealand cricketer who became, over the course of the 1990s, a folk-hero in New Zealand cricket.

A left-handed middle-order batsman and deliverer of right-arm slow-medium deliveries, Harris rescued the New Zealand team's batting on numerous occasions and his deceptive looping bowling often restricted the run rates of opposition batting line-ups.

Personal life
Harris's father Zin Harris was also a New Zealand international player, and his brother Ben Harris has played at first-class level. All three of these players share the family traditional name of "Zinzan", also shared by a distant relation, former All Black Zinzan Brooke.

Domestic career
In first-class cricket Harris has played 128 matches and scored over 7000 runs at an average of over 45, including 13 centuries with a highest score of 251*. He has taken over 120 wickets at an average of 38, with best figures of 4/22. However, his test career was limited to just 23 Tests, where his average with the bat was only around 20, and he took only 16 wickets at 73 runs apiece.

In 2007 Harris played for Bacup in the Lancashire League and finished the season as the League's highest wicket-taker with 82 at 13.08. Harris was the captain of the Indian Cricket League's Hyderabad Heroes.

Harris is also a sensation at the indoor version of the game and represented Canterbury and New Zealand at will and is also involved in the coaching of Canterbury youth indoor cricket teams.

During the 2012–13 season, Harris played club cricket as a player/coach for Papatoetoe Cricket Club, Auckland, New Zealand.

Since the 2013–14 season, Harris has joined the Sydenham Cricket Club, Christchurch, New Zealand and was selected as the club's Player of the Year. Harris became the Premier teams Player/Coach at the start of the 2014–15 season. In the 2015/16 season, Harris led the Sydenham Premier team to win their first 2 Day Championship title in 30 years, culminating in winning the Canterbury Metropolitan Cricket Association's "Men’s Club Cricket Player of the Year" award.

Harris stepped down as Sydenham Player/Coach at the start of the 2019–20 season, being replaced by another former Black Cap Matthew Bell. Harris still played for the Premier team in the 1-Day competition.

International career
Harris's biggest contribution to the game, however, is in the One Day International arena in 2004, Harris became the first New Zealand player to have played 250 ODIs, in a season in which he was also the first New Zealander to take 200 wickets, at an average of 37 and an economy rate of just 4.28. In these matches, he also scored over 4300 runs at an average of 29 and has over 90 catches in the field. Harris also has a reputation for his abilities as a close fielder, achieving many run-outs with accurate throwing from positions such as the square leg.

Harris had been a genuine pace bowler – albeit a wayward one – as a junior cricketer, but decided, under the watchful eye of a mentor John Bracewell, to sacrifice a few yards of pace for accuracy. His gentle looping swing bowling makes the batsman work hard, as the ball is less likely to speed to the boundary, and the deceptiveness of the ball's speed often leaves them attempting to play the ball too early.

Trivia
Harris is currently second in the list of the world record for the most caught and bowled dismissals in ODIs with 29 just after Muttiah Muralitharan who has 35 dismissals in his career.

Chris Harris holds the record for scoring the most number of ODI runs when batting at number 7 position( 2130) and also he became the first man to score 2000+ ODI runs at number 7 position.

Injury
Unfortunately, Harris's performance in his 250th match was curtailed by a serious shoulder injury, and for some time the future of his career was in doubt. In his early post-shoulder injury games, he was forced to remove the medium-slow from his repertoire and was decidedly less effective. Performances for the New Zealand A side in September 2005 were more promising, however, with several very economical performances against Sri Lanka A.

After cricket

Harris become one of many high-profile international cricketers to move to Zimbabwe to be involved in the country's cricket, and was in charge of the national U-19 side. He also was a cricket commentator for Sky Sport.

References

External links
 
 

1969 births
Living people
Canterbury cricketers
Derbyshire cricketers
Gloucestershire cricketers
New Zealand One Day International cricketers
New Zealand Test cricketers
New Zealand cricketers
Cricketers at the 1992 Cricket World Cup
Cricketers at the 1996 Cricket World Cup
Cricketers at the 1998 Commonwealth Games
Cricketers at the 1999 Cricket World Cup
Cricketers at the 2003 Cricket World Cup
Commonwealth Games bronze medallists for New Zealand
New Zealand cricket coaches
ICL World XI cricketers
Hyderabad Heroes cricketers
Commonwealth Games medallists in cricket
South Island cricketers
Medallists at the 1998 Commonwealth Games